The Edward Fenns Whitman House is a historic residence in Boaz, Alabama.  The house was built in 1924 by E. F. Whitman, a businessman who has served as Boaz's first mayor in 1896.  Whitman was heavily involved in manufacturing development in the new town, and owned interests in a cottonseed oil mill, a fertilizer plant, an ice plant, a cotton mill which produced twine, and petitioned for a new highway (later replaced by U.S. 431) to be routed through Boaz.  In 1924, he replaced his original frame house with a brick Craftsman-style home designed by prominent Birmingham architect William Leslie Welton.  Built at the height of the Craftsman movement, its tiled roof and porch with heavy brick piers, exposed rafter ends, and rectilinear fireplace mantles are all representative of the style.  Whitman sold the house in 1939; it was purchased by Dr. Marston Hunt in 1942 who was one of the founders of the Boaz-Albertville Hospital in 1956.  The house was sold in 1992 and converted into a bed and breakfast hotel.  The house was listed on the National Register of Historic Places in 1997.

References

National Register of Historic Places in Marshall County, Alabama
Houses on the National Register of Historic Places in Alabama
American Craftsman architecture in Alabama
Houses completed in 1924
Houses in Marshall County, Alabama